The 2014–15 Ohio State Buckeyes women's basketball team will represent the Ohio State University during the 2014–15 NCAA Division I women's basketball season. The Buckeyes, led by second year head coach Kevin McGuff, play their home games at Value City Arena and were members of the Big Ten Conference. They finished the season 24–11, 13–5 in Big Ten play to finish in third place. They advanced to the championship game of the Big Ten women's basketball tournament where they lost to Maryland. They received at-large bid of the NCAA women's tournament where they defeated James Madison in the first round before losing the gamewinning buzzer beater to North Carolina in the second round to end their season.

Roster

Schedule

|-
!colspan=9 style="background:#B31021; color:#999999;"| Exhibition

|-
!colspan=9 style="background:#B31021; color:#999999;"| Non-conference regular season

|-
!colspan=9 style="background:#B31021; color:#999999;"| Big Ten Regular Season

|-
!colspan=9 style="background:#B31021; color:#999999;"| 2015 Big Ten Conference Women's tournament

|-
!colspan=9 style="background:#B31021; color:#999999;"| NCAA Women's tournament

Rankings

See also
2014–15 Ohio State Buckeyes men's basketball team

References

Ohio State Buckeyes women's basketball seasons
Ohio State
Ohio
Ohio State Buckeyes
Ohio State Buckeyes